Acleris thiana is a species of moth of the family Tortricidae. It is found in China (Zhejiang).

References

Moths described in 1966
thiana
Moths of Asia